A list of festivals in Tunisia

 International Instrumental Festival – Tunis. Focuses on North African traditions. (February)
 Octopus Festival – Kerkennah Islands (March)
 Sousse Spring Festival. International arts festival including concerts, shows and theatre (March)
Mawjoudin Queer Film Festival - Tunis (March)
 Orange Blossom Festival – Menzel Bou Zelfa, Nabeul and Hammamet (March - April)
 Sbeitla's Spring International Festival - Sbeitla - (April)
 Ksour Festival – Tatouine. Culture of ksar dwellers (April)
 Folk Art Festival – Tatouine. (April)
 Festival of the Mountain Oases – Midès, Tamezret. Berber culture. (Late April)
 Passover Festival – El-Ghriba Synagogue, Djerba. (April or May)
 The Jerid Festival – Nefta and surrounding towns (May)
 Music Festival – Sfax. Classical and pop music concerts. (May)
 Falconry Festival – El Haouaria (June)
 Arab Horse Festival – Sidi Bou Saïd (June)
 International Malouf Music Festival – Testour (June)
 Tabarka Jazz Festival (June - July)
 Ulysses Festival – Houmt Souk. Song and dance festival with historic and mythological themes. (July)
 International Festival of Sbeitla - Sbeitla (July)
 Mermaid Festival – Kerkennah Islands. Concerts and performances. (July)
 Carnival of Awussu – Sousse. Parade. (July)
 Hammamet International Festival. Music and theatre. (July)
 International Festival of Bizerte. Music, art, dance and food. (July)
 Nights of La Marsa. Music, theatre and ballet. (July)
 International Festival of Symphonic Music – The amphitheatre of El Djem (July) 
 Carthage Music Festival (July)
 Plastic Arts Festival – Mahrès (Sfax) (July–August)
 Sponge Festival – Zarzis (August)
 Festival of Diving – Tabarka (August)
Chouftouhonna Festival - Tunis (September)
 Coralis Festival of Underwater Photography – Tabarka (September)
 Wine Festival – Grombalia (September)
 Wheat Festival – Béja (September)
 Carthage Film Festival (October)
 Date Harvest Festival – Kebili (November)
 International Oases Festival – Tozeur (November)
 International Festival of Sahara in Douz - Dance, theatre, music, Douz (November–December)
 Gsour festival

See also
 List of festivals in Africa

References

 

 
 
 
 L
 Festivals
 Festivals
Tunisia
Tunisia
Festivals